The Criquet Storch is a Colombian light-sport aircraft that was designed and produced by Criquet Aviation of Guaymaral Airport, Bogotá. The aircraft is a 75% scale replica of the German Second World War STOL liaison aircraft, the  Fieseler Fi 156 Storch, with the company named for the French post-war production model of the same aircraft, the Morane-Saulnier MS.505 Criquet.

Design and development
The aircraft was adapted from the original German plans to comply with the US light-sport aircraft rules. It features a strut-braced high-wing, a two-seats-in-tandem enclosed cockpit, fixed conventional landing gear and a single engine in tractor configuration.

Standard engines that were available include the  Rotax 912ULS,  turbocharged Rotax 914,  Rotec R2800,  Rotec R3600 radial engine and the  Lycoming O-235 four-stroke powerplants.

The design is an accepted Federal Aviation Administration Special Light-sport Aircraft.

Specifications (version)

See also
Carlson Criquet
Pazmany PL-9 Stork
RagWing RW19 Stork
Slepcev Storch

References

Homebuilt aircraft
Light-sport aircraft
Single-engined tractor aircraft
High-wing aircraft